Ophidion is a genus of cusk-eels.

Species
There are currently 28 recognized species in this genus:
 Ophidion antipholus R. N. Lea & C. R. Robins, 2003 (Longnose cusk-eel)
 Ophidion asiro (D. S. Jordan & Fowler, 1902)
 Ophidion barbatum Linnaeus, 1758 (Snake blenny)
 Ophidion dromio R. N. Lea & C. R. Robins, 2003 (Shorthead cusk-eel)
 Ophidion exul C. R. Robins, 1991
 Ophidion fulvum (Hildebrand & F. O. Barton, 1949) (Earspot cusk-eel)
 Ophidion galeoides (C. H. Gilbert, 1890) (Striped cusk-eel)
 Ophidion genyopus (J. D. Ogilby, 1897) (Ravenous cusk)
 Ophidion grayi (Fowler, 1948) (Blotched cusk-eel)
 Ophidion guianense R. N. Lea & C. R. Robins, 2003 (Guianan cusk-eel)
 Ophidion holbrookii Putnam, 1874 (Band cusk-eel)
 Ophidion imitator R. N. Lea, 1997 (Mimic cusk-eel)
 Ophidion iris Breder, 1936 (Rainbow cusk-eel)
 Ophidion josephi Girard, 1858
 Ophidion lagochila (J. E. Böhlke & C. R. Robins, 1959) (Harelip cusk)
 Ophidion lozanoi Matallanas, 1990
 Ophidion marginatum DeKay, 1842 (Striped cusk-eel)
 Ophidion metoecus C. R. Robins, 1991
 Ophidion muraenolepis Günther, 1880 (Blackedge cusk)
 Ophidion nocomis C. R. Robins & J. E. Böhlke, 1959 (Letter opener)
 Ophidion puck R. N. Lea & C. R. Robins, 2003 (Pallid cusk-eel)
 Ophidion robinsi Fahay, 1992 (Colonial cusk-eel)
 Ophidion rochei J. P. Müller, 1845 (Roche's snake blenny)
 Ophidion saldanhai Matallanas & Brito, 1999
 Ophidion scrippsae (C. L. Hubbs, 1916) (Basketweave cusk-eel)
 Ophidion selenops C. R. Robins & J. E. Böhlke, 1959 (Mooneye cusk-eel)
 Ophidion smithi (Fowler, 1934)
 Ophidion welshi (Nichols & Breder, 1922) (Crested cusk-eel)

References

 
Ophidiidae
Taxa named by Carl Linnaeus